"Step Back" / "Slide" is a double A-side single by Australian nu metal group, Superheist from their debut album, The Prize Recruit. Both tracks were co-written by Richard William "DW" Norton on lead guitar and backing vocals; Roderick "Burger" McLeod on lead vocals; and Fetah Sabawi on synthesisers and samplers. It had less chart success than the previous two singles, although it reached the top 100 on the ARIA Singles Chart. The album, including both tracks, was produced by Kalju Tonuma. The cover was a cardboard sheath over a jewel-case CD featuring a flip style alternative cover with concept art for the two A-sides. Only "Step Back" was provided with promotional music video.

Track listing
AUS CD single PIV0001
 "Step Back" (edit) – 3:01
 "Slide" (edit) – 3:06
 "When the Smoke Clears" – 1:58
 "Unlearn" (live) – 2:53
 "Pulse" (live) – 3:31

Charts

References 

Superheist songs
2001 singles